Heliothis fuscimacula is a species of moth of the family Noctuidae first described by Anthonie Johannes Theodorus Janse in 1917. It is found in Africa, including South Africa and Eswatini.

External links
 
 Malolotja Nature Reserve - Fauna - Moths Checklist. Archived March 3, 2016.

Heliothis
Taxa named by Anthonie Johannes Theodorus Janse
Moths described in 1917